Company B may refer to:
Company B (band), a dance-pop trio
Company B (album), Company B's 1987 debut album
Company B, former name of Belvoir (theatre company) in Sydney, Australia
Company B, a modern piece by American choreographer Paul Taylor